McSporran is a surname. Notable people with the surname include:

Jermaine McSporran (born 1977) British semi-professional footballer
Seamus McSporran (born 1938), Scottish man who worked in 14 jobs for 31 years in the Scottish island of Gigha. 
Willie McSporran, former chair of the Hebridean Isle of Gigha's Heritage Trust.